San Michele Arcangelo is a Roman Catholic church located in the center of the town of Bolognola, province of Macerata, region of Marche, Italy.

History
The church and its tall bell tower were rebuilt in a Gothic Revival-style after avalanches in 1930 and 1934 destroyed the prior church. The church contains a polyptych by Giulio Vergari of Amandola and a fresco detached from the razed church of Santa Maria a Piè del Sasso depicting the Crucifixion.

References

19th-century Roman Catholic church buildings in Italy
Gothic Revival church buildings in Italy
Bolognola